Balutabad (also Romanized as Balūţābād) is a village in Aviz Rural District, in the Central District of Farashband County, Fars Province, Iran. At the 2006 census, its population was 270, in 57 families.

References 

Populated places in Farashband County